Shilton van Wyk is a South African rugby union player, playing with the South Africa national rugby sevens team.

International rugby career 
He debuted for the Blitzboks in 2022 at the Dubai tournament.

References

Living people
1999 births
South African rugby union players
South Africa international rugby sevens players